Shane Lennon is a Gaelic footballer from County Louth, Ireland. He plays with the Louth and Kilkerley Emmets teams. He was part of the Louth team that played in the final of the Leinster Senior Football Championship in 2010, but were beaten in controversial circumstances by Meath. He helped Louth to win both Tommy Murphy Cup and National League Div 2 tiles in 2006.
Currently Shane works for Leinster GAA as a GDA.

Honours
 National Football League Division 2 (1) 2006
 Tommy Murphy Cup (1) 2006
 National Football League Division 3 (1) 2011
 O'Byrne Cup (1) 2009
 Dublin Senior Football Championship (1) 2006
 McGeough Cup (1) 2011

References
 http://hoganstand.com/louth/ArticleForm.aspx?ID=59003
 http://hoganstand.com/louth/ArticleForm.aspx?ID=65457
 http://hoganstand.com/louth/ArticleForm.aspx?ID=43447

1985 births
Living people
Kilkerley Emmets Gaelic footballers
Louth inter-county Gaelic footballers